Nemophora askoldella is a moth of the family Adelidae or fairy longhorn moths. It was described by Pierre Millière in 1879. It is found in China, South Korea, Japan and the Khabarovsk and Primorye regions of the Russian Far East.

References

Adelidae
Moths described in 1879
Moths of Japan
Moths of Asia